Lapampasaurus is an extinct genus of hadrosaurid known from the Late Cretaceous Allen Formation (late Campanian or early Maastrichtian stage) of La Pampa Province, Argentina. It contains a single species, Lapampasaurus cholinoi.

The generic name refers to the Argentine province of La Pampa. The specific name honours the late collector José Cholino. The material includes cervical, dorsal, sacral and caudal vertebrae, the forelimb girdle, and the partial hindlimb.

See also 
 Timeline of hadrosaur research

References 

Hadrosaurs
Campanian life
Maastrichtian life
Late Cretaceous dinosaurs of South America
Cretaceous Argentina
Fossils of Argentina
Allen Formation
Fossil taxa described in 2012
Ornithischian genera